Mindat is located at south of the Chin State. Mindat is a town in the Chin State of Western Myanmar.It is the administration seat of Mindat Township and Mindat District. The people speak the K’cho language.

People

The people living in Mindat are called K'Cho, which is made up of three tribes; Mün/Müün, Daai, and Kaang. The K'Cho people are known for their rare tradition of females having their face tattooed. However, this tradition is no longer practice since the mid 1900s and face tattoo can only be seen on elderly women. Beginning in the early 21st century, many of the K'Cho people have migrated to many different parts of the world including United States, Australia, Denmark, Norway, New Zealand, Malaysia, and many others.

Based on a translated conversation with a group of elderly women with tattooed faces (2016):

 A girl would decide when she was ready to have her face tattooed. She would take an offering to the woman who gave the tattoos.
 The entire face could be tattooed in as little as an hour. The time depended on how many breaks the girl needed, since it is a painful procedure. The time is estimated, since they did not have clocks in those days.

Climate

Mindat has a humid subtropical climate (Köppen climate classification Cwa). Temperatures are warm for most of the year, but the winter months (November–February) are cooler. There is a winter dry season (December–May) and a summer wet season (June–November).

Geography 
The main part of the town runs along the ridge of a mountain. The paved road runs from Pakokku to Matupi.

Transport

Bus 
There is a bus station with direct buses to Pakokku or Matupi. These run mainly in the morning. The Pakokku bus route is approximately 4.5 hours and the Matupi bus route is approximately 5 hours.

Walking trails 
Before the road was built and regular bus service began, students walked from Mindat to the advanced schools in Pakokku. The route was by walking trail and took 2 to 3 days.

Accommodation 
There are small hotels and guesthouses in Mindat that are available to both Myanmar people and foreigners.

Tun Guesthouse 
Private rooms with shared bathroom. Private rooms with bathroom. Common room has a television and seating.

Religion 

There are various religions in the town. Missionaries walk or motorbike to outlying villages to convert people.

Catholic 
There is a Catholic church, which maintains a nursery school and living quarters for the elderly.

Buddhism 
There are three Buddhist monasteries; one in the Western Quarter, another in Sanpya Quarter and the last one in Eastern Quarter.

Notable residents
 San Yu Htwe, Olympic archer in the 2016 Summer Olympics

References

External links
Satellite map at Maplandia.com

Township capitals of Myanmar
Populated places in Chin State